Zhang Huichong (1898–1962) was a Cantonese director, actor, sailor, and magician. He was the fifth oldest out of eleven total brothers in his extended family and the eldest brother in his immediate family. His brothers Zhang Qingpu and Zhang Huimin also worked in the film industry and founded their own film company called Huaju. One of his younger brothers, Zhang Damin, was the ex-husband of the famous silent film actress, Ruan Lingyu. Zhang Huichong is known for helping Ruan Lingyu start her acting career by urging her to audition for films and introducing her to a film producing company.

Films 
Zhang Huichong directed and starred in many films throughout the 1920s. Several years into his acting career, he created his own company called Huichong Film Company. Zhang directed and starred in several martial arts films while he was running this company. They were some of the first martial arts films seen in China. Over time, martial arts cinema was refined by Zhang Huichong and Zhang Huimin. The two brothers shaped an ideal modern form for the genre. Zhang Huichong has also been credited as one of China's first martial arts film stars.

Films Starred In

 1922 – The Lotus Falls; directed by Ren Pengnian
 1922 – The Good Brothers; dir. Ren Pengnian
 1923 – The Patriotic Umbrella; dir. Ren Pengnian
 1924 – The Stupid Policeman; dir. Chen Shouyin
 1925 – The Newlyweds' Home; dir. Ren Jinpin
 1926 – The Unknown Hero; dir. Zhang Shichuan
 1927 – Fallen Plum Blossoms (3 parts); dir. Zhang Shichuan
 1927 – Tian Qilang (Adaptation); dir. Zhang Shichuan
 1927 – Ma Yongzhen From Shandong; dir. Zhang Shichuan
 1929 – Hero With No Foes; dir. Shao Zuiweng
 1929 – China's Top Detective; dir. Xu Wenrong
 1930 – Love and Revenge; dir. Bu Wancang

Films Starred and Directed

 1924 – When Water Goes Down, Rocks Appear
 1924 – Five O'Clock
 1925 – Out of the Hell
 1926 – Seizing a National Treasure
 1927 – Hero of the Waters
 1928 – The Little Tyrant Wang Zhangchong
 1930 – Robber of the Yellow Sea

References 

Chinese film directors

Chinese male film actors

Cantonese people

1898 births

1962 deaths